Reinaldo Paseiro (1 February 1925 – 11 June 1973) was a Cuban cyclist. He competed in the time trial and the sprint events at the 1948 Summer Olympics.

References

1925 births
1973 deaths
Cuban male cyclists
Olympic cyclists of Cuba
Cyclists at the 1948 Summer Olympics
Sportspeople from Havana